Sunpyre is a superhero appearing in American comic books published by Marvel Comics. The character is commonly associated with the X-Men, and is the sister of Sunfire.

Fictional character biography
Leyu Yoshida and her brother Shiro were born to a mother who suffered radiation poisoning due to exposure to the atomic bombing of Hiroshima, Japan. As a result, she and her brother were born mutants, possessing identical powers. Her brother would go on to be the well-known Japanese superhero Sunfire.

Leyu first appeared during the Eve of Destruction storyline, when she joined the X-Men for a single mission, to help fight Magneto. Jean Grey had summoned her brother, but instead got Sunpyre, who she says Shiro had never mentioned before, as Shiro had refused because he was unavailable at the time. Despite Jean not knowing Sunpyre, she accepts her offered assistance as the situation is so extreme.

Jean's makeshift team of X-Men includes long-term allies Northstar and Dazzler, and the civilians Omerta and Wraith.

Dazzler had problems of her own and, with a Jean-assisted telepathic conference, Sunpyre learns of the childlike Age of Apocalypse villains. Thus, Sunprye is one of the few in current continuity to know that the Age of Apocalypse had actually happened.

Sunpyre fights valiantly against Magneto, but almost loses her life when the master of magnetism constructs a metallic cocoon around her. After the mission is completed successfully, Sunpyre chooses to return to her home instead of stay in the United States with the "arrogant" X-Men.

Banshee later asks her to join his X-Corps (again replacing Sunfire, who did not want to join). This time she is removed from the front lines and instead spends most of her time in the laboratory studying the mutant Abyss. No explanation is provided for the fifteen-year-old's sudden expertise in mutant genetics. When Mystique, who had infiltrated the group and brought together the other former villains, begins her plan for taking over the X-Corps, Sunpyre is one of the casualties. Mystique stabs her to death. When Banshee finds her corpse, he is also stabbed but survives his wounds. Mystique had wanted to release Abyss, but gets more than she bargained for when the mutant is unable to turn off his powers and sucks the shapeshifter into the dimensional void in his chest cavity.

Sunpyre is later apparently resurrected as a female East Asian mutant who looks exactly like her (complete with her signature flame aura). She has most recently been seen with other former X-Men and X-Men-related characters in Cyclops's Million Mutant March in Washington D.C.

Powers and abilities
Sunpyre has powers similar to those of her brother, Sunfire. She can convert solar and some other ambient energy into ionized plasma similar to the sun's, which she can use to fire blasts of heat and flame and surround herself with an aura of solar-powered fire. This plasma, while surrounding her, also provides protection against energy and physical attacks. Sunpyre is also resistant to most forms of radiation, and can see heat by attuning her eyes to the infrared wavelength of the light wave.

Reception 
 In 2020, CBR.com ranked Sunpyre 8th in their "Marvel Comics: Ranking Every Member Of Big Hero 6 From Weakest To Most Powerful" list.

Other versions

An extra-dimensional Sunpyre, who is a princess on her own homeworld in the Microverse, later appears as part of Big Hero 6 in Alpha Flight vol. 3 #9. Teammate Honey Lemon pulls Sunpyre out of Lemon's Power Purse, resulting in Sunpyre worshipping Honey Lemon as a goddess and Sunpyre joining the team. Sunpyre and Ebon Samurai were both created to fill in the void left by Sunfire and Silver Samurai, who were being used elsewhere at the time. This version of Sunpyre is not on the current Big Hero 6 roster, as she has returned to reclaim her throne with the help of her teammate and current retainer, the undead Ebon Samurai.

Scott Lobdell clarified the relationship of Honey Lemon and Sunpyre in the Marvel Teams Handbook 2005. This Sunpyre retained her powers during M-Day. However, her powers were not mutant in nature, but rather inherent to her extra-dimensional Coronarian race.

References

External links
 
 
Sunpyre on the Marvel Universe Character Bio Wiki
UncannyXmen.net Character Profile on Sunpyre

Characters created by Clayton Henry
Characters created by Salvador Larroca
Characters created by Scott Lobdell
Comics characters introduced in 2001
Comics characters introduced in 2005
Big Hero 6 characters
Fictional princesses
Fictional Japanese people
Fictional characters with fire or heat abilities
Fictional female scientists
Japanese superheroes
Marvel Comics extraterrestrial superheroes
Marvel Comics female superheroes
Marvel Comics LGBT superheroes
Marvel Comics mutants